Bolma castelinae is a species of sea snail, a marine gastropod mollusk in the family Turbinidae, the turban snails.

Description
The height of the shell attains 26.5 mm.

Distribution
This marine species occurs off New Caledonia at a depth of 530 m.

References

 Alf, A., Maestrati, P. & Bouchet, P., 2010. - New species of Bolma (Gastropoda: Vetigastropoda: Turbinidae) from the tropical deep sea. Nautilus 124(2): 93-99

External links
 To Encyclopedia of Life
 To World Register of Marine Species

castelinae
Gastropods described in 2010